Major General Joseph Ndolo was a former Chief of the General Staff and the first African to head the armed forces of Kenya.

Career
Ndolo was a member of the King's African Rifles. At the time of his enlistment Ndolo was working in a plantation in Moshi, Tanzania. He was placed into the 6th Battalion which found its way to Sri Lanka. By the time the second world war had ended Ndolo had risen to the rank of Sergeant in the King's African Rifles. He sought a transfer back to Kenya after being commissioned as Lieutenant, then Captain and finally Major.

He was promoted to Lieutenant Colonel in 1963 and appointed Commanding Officer of the 5th Battalion, Kenya Rifles. He was the first African to head a regiment in East and Central Africa. In 1969 he attained the rank of Major General and appointed as the first African Chief of General Staff.

Ndolo would only last two years after he was implicated in a coup plot against then president Jomo Kenyatta, as he had been named as a possible successor. He resigned his post and Jackson Mulinge was promoted in his place.

References

Personnel of the Kenya Army